Gethu is a 2016 Indian Tamil-language action thriller film written and directed by Krish Thirukumaran. Produced by Udhayanidhi Stalin, the film features himself in the lead role along with Amy Jackson, Sathyaraj in a supporting role, and Vikranth as the main antagonist. Featuring music composed by Harris Jayaraj and cinematography by Sukumar, the film was released on 14 January 2016. It received mixed reviews. Critics praised the cinematography and music of the film but heavily criticized the screenplay and the misleading title of the film.

Plot
The film opens with a renegade sniper named Craig, (Vikranth) who assassinates an army officer from a long distance and is given a new assignment by a traitor (Avinash) to finish off an ISRO scientist named Abdul Kamaal (Sharad Haksar) within 30 days. The story then shifts to Kumily, where a PT teacher named Thulasi Raman (Sathyaraj) leads a peaceful life with his son Sethu (Udhayanidhi Stalin), wife (Pragathi), and daughter. Sethu, who works as a librarian to retired Colonel Matthews (Rajesh), meets a kleptomaniac named Nandhini (Amy Jackson), who steals books from the library. After a few altercations, the two fall in love. Craig, for some unknown reasons, lands in the hill town and is seen wandering and taking photographs of Matthews. Meanwhile, Thulasi Raman complaints about a political based bar owner named Kandhan (Mime Gopi), and in an ensuing fight, Sethu comes to his rescue by bashing up the goons.  Mysteriously, the corpse of Kandhan is pulled out of a waterfall, and a ring belonging to Thulasi Raman is found in his hands. The police then arrests Thulasi Raman. Sethu takes it upon himself to clear his father's name and set out to find the real killer.

Cast

 Udhayanidhi Stalin as Sethu Raman
 Sathyaraj as Thulasi Raman
 Amy Jackson as Nandhini Ramanujan
 Vikranth as Craig aka Bull
 Karunakaran as Kanagu
 Pragathi as Thulasi Raman's wife
 Rajesh as Colonel Matthews
 Sachu as Vathsala Sadagoppan
 Mime Gopi as Kandhan
 I. M. Vijayan as Rajendran
 Avinash as Craig's boss
 Anuradha as Kandhan's mother
 Vasu Vikram as Headmaster
 Uma as herself (guest appearance)
 Besant Ravi 
 Supergood Subramani
 Aadukalam Naren as DSP (guest appearance)
 Sharad Haksar as Abdul Kamal (guest appearance)
Sandy  (guest appearance in the song "Mutta Bajji")
 Mahek Chahal in an item number

Production
In July 2014, Udhayanidhi Stalin revealed that he would collaborate with director Thirukumaran of Maan Karate (2014) fame for his next production. Gethu was revealed to be the title in September 2014, with Harris Jayaraj and Sukumar signed on as music composer and cinematographer respectively. Actor Vikranth, previously only seen in leading roles, signed on to appear in the film as an antagonist. Sathyaraj was chosen to play the father of Udhayanidhi's character and was given top billing in the credits. The film was revealed to be half complete by April 2015, and a first look poster was released to the public. The team began a second schedule in Kodaikanal later that month. Gethu also marks the first major appearance of Udhayanidhi in a non-comedy film. He stated that he chose to work on the film due to having grown bored of working in comedy films, and his desire to "experiment, try something different".

Release
The satellite rights of the film were sold to Sun TV. The film was released on 14 January 2016, coinciding with Pongal, and received negative critical response. M Suganth of The Times of India rated it 2.5 out of 5, commenting, "Thirukumaran has the essentials for a high-concept thriller — a determined hitman, an ordinary man who stumbles into a nefarious plot by accident, a sub-plot that provides some mystery, and a bit of family drama. It is in his execution that he falters. For a thriller clocking in at under two hours, Gethu moves at a pace that is as sleepy as the hill station where the action happens. The director's choice of slow motion shots as a device to make the action stylish and prolong the tension in the plot works against the film." Sudhir Srinivasan of The Hindu stated, "The whole movie bears the flavour of a short-story adaptation, and at a little over two hours, there isn't too much duration in which to flood the story with masala elements and thoroughly destroy it, although, to its discredit, Gethu certainly does try."

The entertainment tax exemption request for the film was denied on the basis that the filmmakers misspelled the English title as "Gethu" instead of "Kethu", the latter being the correct transliteration of a Tamil word. Government officials argued that since films released using Tamil words are entitled to an entertainment tax, and that "Gethu" is not a Tamil word, the film would not be entitled to an exemption. The matter was heard by the Madras State Court, which ruled that the film was entitled to the entertainment tax exemption.

Music

The film's soundtrack album and background score was composed by Harris Jayaraj. The soundtrack album consists of five tracks, and Harris is collaborating with Udhayanidhi Stalin for the fourth time in this project. The music rights were purchased by Divo. The soundtrack's track list was released by Red Giant Movies on 23 December 2015.  The track list was unveiled on YouTube using an innovative motion poster technique. The album was released on 25 December 2015, coinciding with Christmas celebrations.

References

External links
 

2016 films
2010s Tamil-language films
2016 action thriller films
Films scored by Harris Jayaraj
Films about snipers
Indian action thriller films